USS Opportune (ARS-41) was a Bolster-class rescue and salvage ship acquired by the U.S. Navy during World War II. Her task was to come to the aid of stricken vessels.

Opportune was laid down 13 September 1944 by Basalt Rock Company in Napa, California; launched 31 March 1945; sponsored by Mrs. Kenneth Sanger; and commissioned at Mare Island, California, 5 October 1945.

Post-World War II operations 
 
After training on the California coast, Opportune sailed from San Pedro, California, 11 December 1945 for San Juan, Puerto Rico, her base for the next eight years. Operating primarily as a salvage schoolship for the Atlantic Fleet, Opportune also towed disabled craft among Caribbean ports and on occasion, to Norfolk, Virginia, and New York. Frequently she acted as air-sea rescue tug during fleet operations off Culebra Island.

North Atlantic operations 
 
She made her homeport at Norfolk from 23 October 1953. Each year she sailed north to take part in resupply operations for northern stations of the Army, Air Force, Navy, and Weather Service, often serving for extended periods as station ship at Naval Air Station Argentia, Newfoundland. On each such deployment she performed the variety of services which makes the fleet repair and salvage ship a Navy workhorse: towing barges and disabled craft; repairing other ships, dock, and port facilities; salvaging and lifting sunken ships and equipment; laying cable; fighting fires; tending buoys; providing deep sea divers; installing moorings; searching for and recovering downed aircraft; and aiding men and ships in distress at sea. She carried out the same duties from Norfolk and in the Caribbean when not operating in the north.

Goodwill missions 
 
Opportune performed missions of international goodwill and mercy on her first European cruise (April–June 1960). She escorted two Iranian ships to the entrance of the Mediterranean, then sailed directly to Agadir, Morocco, where she delivered 50 tons of clothing donated by the Navy for victims of the recent earthquake. Princess Lasla Aisha, sister of the King of Morocco, came on board to thank Opportune for her aid.
 
A second European cruise (May–June 1961) represented a major contribution to the strengthening of the Navy's power to keep peace. Opportunes captain, Lt. Comdr. Thomas F. Byrnes, Jr., took command of a task group which included four Navy and two civilian tugs. The assignment: tow to the Polaris Submarine Base at Holy Loch, Scotland, four large sections of AFDB–7, an enormous floating drydock. This difficult mission accomplished, Opportune visited Belfast, Northern Ireland, before returning to Norfolk 23 June.

East Coast operations 
 
For the next three years the salvage ship operated on the U.S. East Coast and in the Caribbean, devoting most of her effort to cable laying operations. Highlights of this period were assistance to Norwegian ship  which had been damaged in a collision off the entrance to Chesapeake Bay in the spring of 1962; service off Cape Canaveral, Florida, at the launch of Major Gordon Cooper's Faith 7 Project Mercury space capsule a year later; and searching for inactive destroyer escort , which had broken free during hurricane Jenny while being towed to Charleston, South Carolina, and escorting the maverick to safety at Norfolk late in October 1963.

Circumnavigating the globe 
 
Opportune shed her cable laying gear at Norfolk the summer of 1964 and spent the remainder of the year supporting fleet training operations. After overhaul during the summer of 1965, Opportune visited Scotland in the fall to take in tow a leased Royal Navy lift craft ALC-24 for delivery to Subic Bay, Philippine Islands. She departed Rosyth 24 November and touched Gibraltar and Crete before transiting the Suez Canal. The long voyage ended when Opportune delivered her tow to Subic Bay 2 February 1966. Underway again four days later, she made Yokosuka, Japan; Pearl Harbor; San Diego, California; and Acapulco, Mexico en route to the Panama Canal. The ship reached Little Creek, Virginia, 8 April 1966. She took pride in having completed the longest tow on record by a U. S. Navy salvage ship and in being the first Navy salvage ship to circumnavigate the globe.

Continued operations 
 
For the remainder of the year Opportune operated along the east coast visiting the Canal Zone in June and in August she returned to Cape Canaveral for the unmanned Apollo 202 launch. Into 1970 Opportune continued to serve the Atlantic Fleet.

Opportune assisted with the recovery of the Space Shuttle Challenger (destroyed of the coast of Florida in 1986) and was later deployed in support of Operation Just Cause to keep the Panama Canal open and operating at normal capacity.  Opportune conducted several support missions in the Caribbean and conducted several interesting towing operations prior to deployment to the Mediterranean during Operation Desert Storm/Shield as the US Navy's standby rescue and salvage ship.  Opportune assisted in the recovery of numerous downed aircraft (fixed wing and helicopters) and assisted with several at-sea firefighting/towing operations prior to returning to her home port at Little Creek, Virginia.

First US Navy ship commanded by a woman 

LCDR Darlene Iskra became the first woman commanding officer of a US Navy ship when she assumed command of Opportune at Naples, Italy on 27 December 1990. She served as the commanding officer until 1993.

Decommissioning 

Opportune was decommissioned and struck from the Naval Register, 30 April 1993. Her title was transferred  to the Maritime Administration (MARAD), 1 February 1999. Opportune was laid up in the National Defense Reserve Fleet, James River, Fort Eustis, Virginia.  Final Disposition: a contract for scrapping was awarded to Bay Bridge Enterprises, Chesapeake, Virginia, and Opportune was towed from the National Defense Reserve Fleet, James River to Bay Bridge Enterprises, Chesapeake, Virginia, 5 December 2003.

Military awards and honors 

Navy records indicate the following battle stars for Opportune:
Her crew was eligible for the following medals, ribbons and commendations:

 Navy Unit Commendation
 Navy Meritorious Unit Commendation (5 stars)
 Coast Guard Meritorious Unit Commendation
 Navy Battle "E" Ribbon (3 awards)
 American Campaign Medal
 World War II Victory Medal
 National Defense Service Medal with star
 Armed Forces Expeditionary Medal (Cuba)
 Vietnam Service Medal (1 campaign star for the Vietnam Counteroffensive Campaign (19 January to 26 February 1966)
 Southwest Asia Service Medal with star
 Republic of Vietnam Campaign Medal

References

External links 
 Dictionary of American Naval Fighting Ships
 NavSource Online: Service Ship Photo Archive - ARS-41 Opportune
  Basalt Rock Company Shipbuilding History

 

Bolster-class rescue and salvage ships
Ships built in Napa, California
1945 ships
World War II auxiliary ships of the United States
Korean War auxiliary ships of the United States
Vietnam War auxiliary ships of the United States